Washington Memorial Chapel — located on Pennsylvania Route 23 in Valley Forge National Historical Park — is both a national memorial dedicated to General George Washington and an active Episcopal parish in Valley Forge, Pennsylvania. The church was inspired by a sermon preached by Anglican minister Reverend Dr. W. Herbert Burk, founder and first rector of the parish. The building was designed by architect Milton B. Medary. It was listed on the National Register of Historic Places on May 1, 2017, and is undergoing an active restoration campaign.

It is physically located in Upper Merion Township.

History

Reverend Burk was rector of an Episcopal church in nearby Norristown. The money for the chapel was raised in small increments (nickels and dimes), and its stone walls were built a "few feet at a time." In the religious and patriotic zeal of the day, Dr. Burk was active in trying to preserve Valley Forge, and in the establishment of the Valley Forge Museum of American History (the predecessor to the Valley Forge Historical Society).

A previous attempt to build a memorial church at Valley Forge had been launched in 1885 by  Baptist minister James M. Guthrie, who raised funds and began building before running out of funds.

On June 19, 1903, the 125th anniversary of the evacuation of the Continental Army from Valley Forge, the cornerstone was laid on property donated by the I. Heston Todd family. A small wood-framed building nearby preceded the present structure. Following President Theodore Roosevelt's visit to the site and address in 1904, the original wooden building was named the "Theodore Roosevelt Chapel." It was demolished after completion of the present chapel.

The Chapel's exterior was completed in 1917 and its interior in 1921. It serves as a wayside chapel to those who visit Valley Forge National Historical Park, and is open to the public.

Noted ironsmith Samuel Yellin produced the wrought iron gates, hardware, and locks. He was one of many artisans to produce sculptures, stonework, stained glass and metal work. The interior woodwork was supplied by Belgian-American cabinetmaker Edward Maene (1852–1931).

From the visitor's perspective the Chapel, with its central location, can appear to be a part of the park.  However, the Chapel and surrounding property belong to the Episcopal Church. Across Valley Forge Park Road (formerly, Port Kennedy Road), standing opposite from the Chapel, is the builder's model of the Washington Monument. This obelisk marks the grave of Lieutenant John Waterman. The original Waterman gravestone had been on display in the visitor's center museum. The Bell Tower houses the DAR Patriot Rolls, listing those that served in the Revolutionary War, and the Chapel grounds hosted the World of Scouting Museum until ca. 2013.

National Patriots Bell Tower and Carillon

The National Patriots Bell Tower was a later addition to the Chapel, and houses its carillon.  The  tower was built entirely with funds raised by members of the National Society of the Daughters of the American Revolution (DAR) over a period of more than a decade. Construction began in 1941, but was suspended due to World War II, and restarted in 1949. The bell tower was completed and dedicated in 1953.

The Justice Bell (Women's Liberty Bell) is on permanent display in the bell tower chamber. It was forged in 1915 as a nearly identical replica of the Liberty Bell, and became an instrumental symbol of the Women's Suffrage movement. In 1920, after touring many parts of the country to promote the passing of the 19th Amendment, the bell was stored on the grounds of Valley Forge National Park before being permanently moved to the bell tower chamber in 1943.

The bell tower contains a traditional carillon, with a keyboard of 58 bells. The first 14 bells (from the Meneely Bell Foundry) were installed in a temporary wooden tower in 1926, and the number of bells expanded over the course of three decades. Fifty-six bells were installed in the bell tower in 1953, and expanded to 58 bells in 1963 with two bells from the Fonderie Paccard in France.

The bell tower is played regularly by a resident carillonneur. Concerts, both formal and informal, are held throughout the year and are open to the public.

Features

Stained glass
George Washington Window (year?), south wall (over entrance), Nicola D'Ascenzo, designer, depicts 36 scenes from Washington's life
Anthony Wayne Window (year?), west wall, Nicola D'Ascenzo, designer. Depicts 12 scenes of American expansion.
Alexander Hamilton Window (year?), east wall, Nicola D'Ascenzo, designer
Martha Washington Window (1918), north wall (over altar), Nicola D'Ascenzo, designer
Washington at Prayer Window (year?), carillon tower chamber, Nicola D'Ascenzo, designer

Church furniture
Baptismal font (limestone & oak, 1907), Milton B. Medary, designer
Pulpit (limestone, 1909), Milton B. Medary, designer
Lectern and Perclose (limestone, 1909), Milton B. Medary, designer
Altar and reredos (limestone, 1916), Milton B. Medary, designer
Litany desk (Prie-dieu) (white oak, 1916), chancel, Milton B. Medary, designer, Edward Maene, carver
Pews of the Patriots (white oak, 1917), Milton B. Medary, designer, Edward Maene, carver. The left front pew is the Presidents' Pew, dedicated to George Washington and James Monroe, the two future Presidents of the United States who endured the Valley Forge encampment. 
Choir stalls and reredos (white oak, 1917–21), choir, Milton B. Medary, designer, Edward Maene, carver
Prayer Desk (Hand Carved, Engraved, 1916), Milton B. Medary, designer. Dedicated in Memory of Anna Morris Holstein, Founder, Regent Centennial and Memorial Association, led efforts to save, acquire, and preserve Washington’s Headquarters and initial Valley Forge Park acreage. Presented by Daughters of the American Revolution (D.A.R.). and Patriotic Order Sons of America (POS of A).

Sculpture
Valley Forge (Seated Washington) (statuette, bronze, 1878), rood screen, Franklin Simmons, sculptor
Sacrifice and Devotion (Grieving Mother) (statue, bronze, 1914), Heckscher Memorial, Cloister of the Colonies Garden, Bela Pratt, sculptor
Harrison Memorial Gates (wrought iron, 1918), porch, Samuel Yellin, metalworker.
Declaration of Independence Tablet (bas relief, limestone, 1926), nave, Martha Maulsby Hovenden, sculptor. View a short documentary about the Maulsby/Hovenden/Corson families of Plymouth Meeting, PA. 
United States Constitution Tablet (bas relief, limestone, 1936), nave, Martha Maulsby Hovenden, sculptor
Bishop William White (statue, bronze, 1937), Alexander Stirling Calder, sculptor
George Washington (statue, limestone, 1953), exterior of National Patriots Bell Tower, C. Paul Jennewein, sculptor
Nathanael Greene (statue, bronze, 2015), front lawn, Susie Chisholm, sculptor.

Other media
Mosaic portrait bust of George Washington (year?), bell tower chamber, Nicola D'Ascenzo, designer 
Justice Bell (aka The Women's Liberty Bell) (1915), National Patriots Bell Tower chamber.

See also

Valley Forge Pilgrimage
List of carillons in the United States

References

Resources
Rev. W. Herbert Burk, D.D., Making a Museum: The Confessions of a Curator (1926). Burk was the founder and curator of the Valley Forge Museum of American History.
D'Ascenzo Studios, The Memorial Windows, Washington Memorial Chapel, Valley Forge, Pa. (1930).
Eleanor H.S. Burk, In the Beginning: at Valley Forge and the Washington Memorial Chapel (1938).
Shelley A. Perdue, The Washington Memorial Chapel: Historic Structure Report and Condition Assessment, (Masters thesis, University of Pennsylvania, 2005).

External links

Washington Memorial Chapel website
Washington Memorial Chapel & Bell Tower from Philadelphia Architects and Buildings
National Park Service
State Tourist website
World of Scouting Museum

Monuments and memorials to George Washington in the United States
Episcopal churches in Pennsylvania
Monuments and memorials in Pennsylvania
Valley Forge
Churches in Chester County, Pennsylvania
Valley Forge National Historical Park
Churches on the National Register of Historic Places in Pennsylvania
National Register of Historic Places in Montgomery County, Pennsylvania
Upper Merion Township, Montgomery County, Pennsylvania
Towers completed in 1953
Bell towers in the United States
Carillons